The 2001 Miami mayoral election took place on November 6 and November 13, 2001 to elect the mayor of Miami, Florida. The election was officially nonpartisan, and held in conjunction with other city elections. Manny Diaz won, unseating incumbent mayor Joe Carollo and also defeating former mayor Maurice Ferré.

Results

First round
The turnout in the first-round was 34%.

Runoff results

References

2001
2001 United States mayoral elections
2001 Florida elections
Mayoral election, 2001